The 2005 Astro Wah Lai Toi Drama Awards, presented by Astro in Malaysia, was an awards ceremony that recognises the best Hong Kong television programmes that had aired on Malaysia's Astro Wah Lai Toi in 2005. 

The ceremony took place on 7 January 2006 at the Sunway Pyramid in Kuala Lumpur, Malaysia. It was televised live on Astro's Cantonese channel, Astro Wah Lai Toi.

Winners and nominees
Winners are 100% based on popular vote. Top five nominees are in bold.

References

TVB original programming
2006 television awards
2006 in Malaysian television
2006 in Hong Kong television